Maconachie, Maconochie, McOnachie, or MacOnachie is a surname of Scottish origin. Notable persons with the surname include:

Alexander Maconochie, Lord Meadowbank (1777–1861)
Alexander Maconochie (penal reformer) (1787–1860)
Alexander Maconochie Centre, the gaol in the Australian Capital Territory
 G. A. Maconachie (1843–1909), army surgeon in British India
 Grant McConachie (1909 – 1965), Canadian pilot and businessman
 Ian Maconachie, Irish badminton player
 Sir Richard Roy Maconachie  (1885-1962), British Indian civil servant
 Maconochie or Machonochie rations, canned food popular in World War II